John Madigan Cunningham was an American attorney who served as legal counsel to the Roman Catholic Archdiocese of Boston.

Early life
Cunningham was born in Boston to H. Vincent and Anna Smith (Madigan) Cunningham. He attended Boston Public Schools before entering Fordham Preparatory School. At Fordham, Cunningham was class president for four years. After graduating in 1914, Cunningham attended Georgetown University. From 1917 to 1919, Cunningham worked as an assistant on the legal staff at the American consulate in Paris.

Legal career
In 1922, Cunningham graduated from the Boston University School of Law. He then worked for his father's firm in Boston. Cunningham served as legal counsel for the Roman Catholic Archdiocese of Boston and frequently appeared before the Massachusetts General Court on behalf of the Cardinal William Henry O'Connell. He also served on an Archdiocese committee that fought against the legalization of birth control.

Following the impeachment of Massachusetts Governor's Councilor Daniel H. Coakley, Cunningham was appointed to succeed him. His appointment was backed by Republican House Speaker Christian Herter, who argued that because the 4th Council District was overwhelmingly Democratic, a Democrat should be appointed to represent it. Although a Democrat, Cunningham supported Republican Governor Leverett Saltonstall. His nomination was approved on a mostly party-line votes with Republicans supporting the "dark horse" Cunningham and the Democrats back the more well-known John E. Powers.

Cunningham also served as a special assistant to the president of Georgetown University, was a director of the Boston Chamber of Commerce, and served as chairman of Jamaica Plain's draft board.

Personal life
On October 17, 1929, Cunningham married Mildred Manning, the daughter of tobacco merchant Joseph P. Manning. The ceremony was presided over by Cardinal O'Connell.

Cunningham died on February 15, 1973, at Massachusetts General Hospital. He was survived by his wife and two daughters. He was buried at Mount Calvary Cemetery in Roslindale.

References

1973 deaths
Boston University School of Law alumni
Fordham Preparatory School alumni
Georgetown University alumni
Massachusetts Democrats
Massachusetts lawyers
Members of the Massachusetts Governor's Council